Wyoming Highway 28 (WYO 28) is a  Wyoming state highway known as the South Pass Highway.

Route description
 south of the town of Fontenelle, Wyoming Highway 372 splits, with Highway 28 heading Northeast. It crosses the Green River after . After , it intersects U.S. Route 191 at the small town of Farson. After , it spurs north to "Farson Little Sandy Road", leading to Big Sandy. It continues northeast out of Sweetwater County, cuts through a small corner of Sublette County and enters Fremont County. South Pass was used by settlers on the Oregon Trail. From there, there are spurs to the south leading to the South Pass Historic Site and Atlantic City. From there it curves north, travelling about  until its merge with US 287, near Lander.

History

Highway 28 generally follows the route followed by settlers on the Oregon Trail.

Major intersections

References

External links

 Wyoming State Routes 00-99
 Wyoming State Route 28
 WYO 28 - WYO 372 to US 191
 WYO 28 - US 191 to US 287/WYO 789

028
Transportation in Sweetwater County, Wyoming
Transportation in Sublette County, Wyoming
Transportation in Fremont County, Wyoming